Caroline Thomas Rumbold (July 22, 1877 – November 7, 1949) was an American botanist. She specialized in forest pathology. Her researches focused on “fungus diseases of trees and blue stain of wood.”

Biography 
Born on July 22, 1877, in St. Louis, Missouri, United States, Caroline Thomas Rumbold was the daughter of Thomas Frasier Rumbold and Charlotte E. Ledengerber.
In 1901 she graduated from Smith College in Massachusetts. She got both the master's degree and the doctorate from the Washington University in St. Louis.

She started her career as an assistant at the Bureau of Plant Industry, United States Department of Agriculture in 1903. She later moved to University of Missouri to become an assistant in botany.  From 1929 to 1942 she had a long career as an associate pathologist at the Department of Plant Pathology in the University of Wisconsin–Madison.  She briefly worked as a fellow at the Missouri Botanical Garden.

She was associated with a number of professional institutions including Phytopathological Society, the American Society of Plant Physiologists and the Botanical Society of Washington.

She died on November 7, 1949, in Cleveland, Ohio, United States.

References

1877 births
1949 deaths
Pathology
American physiologists
Plant physiologists
American women botanists
Women physiologists
American women academics
20th-century American botanists
20th-century American women scientists
Smith College alumni
Washington University in St. Louis alumni
University of Wisconsin–Madison staff